Epimesophleps symmocella is a moth in the family Gelechiidae. It was described by Rebel in 1907. It is found in Yemen, where it has been recorded from Socotra.

References

Gelechiinae
Moths described in 1907
Fauna of Socotra